Peter Jihde (born 12 July 1971) is a Swedish television host and sports reporter on TV4.

Jihde was born in Malmö, Sweden.  He has hosted Sporten, Fotbollskväll, and has presented Olympic games and football world championships. Jihde has also hosted his own talk show Hos Jihde on SVT. His brother, Niklas Jihde, is a former professional floorball player who currently also works in TV. He is also a host on the channel TV4 Sport.

Jihde has hosted Idol 2007, Idol 2008, Idol 2009 and Idol 2010 in Swedish Idol.

References

External links

Swedish television personalities
Swedish sports broadcasters
People from Malmö
Living people
1972 births
Swedish people of Walloon descent